Gruene may refer to: 

 Gruene, Texas
 Variation of Grün, surname
 Die Grünen (German for "The Greens")